The 1975 Belgian Grand Prix was a Formula One motor race held at Zolder on 25 May 1975. It was race 6 of 14 in both the 1975 World Championship of Drivers and the 1975 International Cup for Formula One Manufacturers. It was the 33rd Belgian Grand Prix and the second to be held at the Circuit Zolder. The race was held over 70 laps of the four kilometre venue for a race distance of 280 kilometres.

The race was won by Austrian driver Niki Lauda driving a Ferrari 312T, his second victory for the year after winning Monaco two weeks prior. Lauda led 65 of the 70 laps, taking a 19-second victory over South African driver Jody Scheckter in a Tyrrell 007. Argentinian driver Carlos Reutemann drove his Brabham BT44B to third place. The win put Lauda into the lead of the championship for the first time in 1975, passing previous leader Emerson Fittipaldi.

Qualifying summary 
Ferrari arrived at Circuit Zolder eager for the fray and buoyed up by their Monaco victory. Niki Lauda dutifully gained pole after a technical gremlin held up early leader Carlos Pace and Saturday's qualifying was rained out. Vittorio Brambilla was third on the grid and Tony Brise stunned on his debut race for Graham Hill, gaining a fourth-row start ahead of Championship leader Emerson Fittipaldi. Ronnie Peterson suffered the unfortunate experience of being given a parking ticket during the practice session – after having parked his car in a dangerous position at the edge of the track, rather than risk a puncture by pulling into the gravel trap. Mario Andretti was missing from the field because he was competing at the Indianapolis 500.

Qualifying classification

Race summary 
Pace took the lead whilst Brambilla and Regazzoni duelled. Jochen Mass and John Watson collided – the German retired whilst Watson returned to the pits with a damaged nosecone. Alan Jones also had to retire after a collision with Jacques Laffite. Arturo Merzario was out with a burnt out clutch. Pace's fiery start was now causing problems with brakes and cold tyres and he was having to drop back.

Brambilla took the lead until lap six when he was passed by Lauda. Tony Brise spun at the chicane and retired shortly after with piston failure. Jody Scheckter was storming through the field to be in second place by lap ninth. Brambilla's brakes were fading and he dropped down the order. Jean-Pierre Jarier spun into the catch-fencing, James Hunt retired with a broken gear-linkage. Clay Regazzoni had risen to third, but then dived into the pits to change a blistered tyre. Lauda led Scheckter comfortably and the race settled down into a procession.

Carlos Pace had handling problems and dropped down the order when he lost third gear. By lap 49, Ronnie Peterson crashed into the catch fencing, whilst Brambilla surrendered third place to change a blistered tyre, resuming but retiring with brake problems.

Fittipaldi was also having brake problems, leaving him helpless against the assault of Regazzoni and Tom Pryce as he dropped from fifth to seventh in the last six laps.

Classification

Championship standings after the race

Drivers' Championship standings

Constructors' Championship standings

Note: Only the top five positions are included for both sets of standings.

References

Belgian Grand Prix
Belgian Grand Prix
Grand Prix
Circuit Zolder